Carbine's Heritage is a 1927 New Zealand film created by Ted Coubray who directed, produced and wrote the screenplay etc. It is now lost.

Plot
A young man finds a loose strayed colt near Hamilton which is not advertised for. So after a year he enters the colt in a show at which the owner a young lady who comes to the show with her father claims. They come to an arrangement about the horse, which is a descendant of the famous horse Carbine. Then the horse is stolen by the pair of villains when being trained ..... The climatic end sequence was filmed at the Christmas 1926 Auckland Cup meeting.

Cast
 Ted Preston ... Tim Hogan 
 Queenie Grahame ... Alice Wylie
 Stuart Douglas ... Harold Wylie 
 Pat O'Connor ... Tom Patten 
 Cook Brothers ... Two crooks

References
New Zealand Film 1912-1996 by Helen Martin & Sam Edwards p37 (1997, Oxford University Press, Auckland) 

1927 films
New Zealand drama films
Films set in New Zealand
1927 drama films
Films set in the 1920s
Films shot in New Zealand
Lost New Zealand films
New Zealand horse racing films
New Zealand silent films
1927 lost films
Lost drama films
1920s English-language films
Silent drama films